Poonch District may refer to:
 Historical Poonch district, prior to 1947
 Poonch district, India
 Poonch District, Pakistan

District name disambiguation pages